Panayiota Andreou (also transliterated Panagiota, born 10 November 1995) is a Cypriot skeet shooter who represented her country at the 2012 Summer Olympics in London, United Kingdom. She is ranked 22nd in the world and shoots for a club in Famagusta.

After qualifying for the games due to a second-place position at the ISSF 2011 Shotgun World Cup in Maribor, she finished 16th in the women's skeet qualifying round with a score of 57 points, failing to qualify for the semi-final.

She participated at the 2018 ISSF World Shooting Championships, winning a medal.

She is the daughter of Antonis Andreou.

References

External links

1995 births
Living people
Cypriot female sport shooters
Skeet shooters
Olympic shooters of Cyprus
Shooters at the 2012 Summer Olympics
Commonwealth Games bronze medallists for Cyprus
Shooters at the 2014 Commonwealth Games
Shooters at the 2018 Commonwealth Games
Commonwealth Games medallists in shooting
European Games competitors for Cyprus
Shooters at the 2015 European Games
People from Paralimni
Shooters at the 2019 European Games
Medallists at the 2018 Commonwealth Games